CFBR may refer to:

 CFBR-FM: A Canadian FM station
 FBR-600: A proposed 600 MWe Indian fast breeder reactor